The 1981 Trans-Am Series was the sixteenth running of the Sports Car Club of America's premier series. All races ran for approximately one hundred miles.

Results

Championships

Drivers
Eppie Wietzes – 179 points
Bob Tullius – 126 points
Phil Currin – 91 points
John Bauer – 79 points
Roy Woods – 78 points

Manufacturers
Chevrolet – 64 points
Porsche – 36 points
Jaguar – 35 points
Ford – 13 points

References

Trans-Am Series
Trans-Am